Deleornis  is a genus of African sunbirds. Its members are sometimes included in Anthreptes.

Its members are:
 Fraser's sunbird, Deleornis fraseri
 Grey-headed sunbird, Deleornis axillaris

The grey-headed sunbird is sometimes considered to be a subspecies of Fraser's sunbird.

The sunbirds are a group of very small Old World passerine birds which feed largely on nectar, although they will also take insects, especially when feeding young. Flight is fast and direct on their short wings. Most species can take nectar by hovering like a hummingbird, but usually perch to feed most of the time.

 
Bird genera